Kurt Agë Kadiu(Lis, Vilayet of Scutari, Ottoman Empire 1868 - Mat, Albania 1923) was a 19th-century Albanian politician. He was one of the delegates of the Albanian Declaration of Independence.

References

19th-century Albanian people
Albanian politicians
1923 deaths
People from Mat (municipality)
1868 births
All-Albanian Congress delegates